Casner Motor Racing Division – also known as America Camoradi (casner motor racing division), Camoradi USA or Camoradi International – was an American racing team of the 1960s known for racing Maserati Birdcage sports cars, and a Porsche and Cooper in Formula One. It was founded by Lloyd "Lucky" Casner in 1960, after he gained interest in the Maserati Tipo 61 in August 1959, and was created to race in the 24 Hours of Le Mans. The Camoradi team won the 1000km Nürburgring in 1960 despite a broken fuel line halfway through the race. The team achieved victory again in 1961, however, due to the unreliability of their cars they never won Le Mans. Camoradi also purchased a single Tipo 63 (a more powerful and faster car) but it also suffered the reliability problems of the Tipo 61s.

Camoradi USA was incorporated in the summer of 1959 and ended due to mismanagement and loss of sponsorship 18 months later. 
Casner stayed on in Europe and re-incorporated his efforts as Camoradi International (1961). Camoradi International continued with sponsorship from Dow Chemical, Maserati and Porsche, and with drivers Stirling Moss, Graham Hill and Masten Gregory. Casner was killed at a LeMans practice in 1965 while trying to qualify a Maserati Tipo 151 for the French distributor, due to a mechanical failure.

Camoradi USA was America's first industry-backed international racing team, pioneering the industry backing of racing as we know it.

At a midsummer 1959 SCCA race in Miami, while racing a Ferrari 250TR, Casner met fellow driver Fred Gamble.  During the victory presentation at the end of the race, Casner announced his intention of racing in Europe and was looking for people to help him fund this venture.  Gamble introduced himself to Casner and offered to help him with publicity, working as a motor journalist and the two formed a partnership to create a racing team.

Gamble, inspired by Ecurie Ecosse, the Scottish National Racing Team that spawned Jim Clark and Jackie Stewart, suggested an American “Olympic Team” of motor racing to challenge the Europeans for World Championships.

Casner’s amateur racing team of friends had called themselves Camoradi Racing Team.  So the professional team was incorporated as Camoradi USA, America’s first industry-sponsored racing team with the best drivers from all race series in the best cars that could be acquired.

Gamble, who had a public relations background, surveyed the New York adverting agency market, to determine their involvement with the auto industry.  He set up appointments for Casner with various advertising agencies looking for sponsorship for the new racing team.  They met with success with the agency of Young & Rubicam, whose major client was the Goodyear Tire & Rubber Company. Gamble, who knew Tony Webner, Goodyear’s first Manager of Racing, convinced him to support their proposal.  Casner and executives from Young and Rubicam made a presentation to the management of Goodyear and won big financial support, tires and engineering support. With the world’s largest tire company supporting them, Camoradi quickly received sponsorship Shell/BP, Excide, Champion, DA Lubricants, Koni, Dow Chemical and Guest Airways.

The only American sports car of that era was, of course, the Corvette, which was needed as the GT challenger in their campaign for the World Sports Car Championship. Casner met with Chevrolet President Ed Cole and Corvette "god-father" Zora Duntov. They enthusiastically offered their support with two competition option Corvettes plus parts and technical support and a generous financial contribution. However, with an agreed industry ban on racing involvement, this support was disguised as a "testing contract" and the cars were supplied thru Don Allen Chevrolet of Miami. Sadly, due to production delays, the Corvettes were not delivered until after the first 1960 World Championship 1000 km race, Buenos Aires.

Casner went to Europe in September 1959 and approached a bankrupt Maserati who had their new Birdcage T61, but no finances to race a factory team.  Camoradi was their answer for 1960.  Casner also formed an alliance with Porsche’s Huschke Von Hanstein and brought two cars from the late Jean Behra’s estate – lightweight Carrera and the special Behra-Porsche F2, which served as a test bed and prototype for the Porsche’s 1960 F2 cars and 1962 F1 1,500cc Formula.

Camoradi “works” Maseratis, led every World Sports Car Championship race of 1960, and won only the 1,000 km Nurburging with Gurney/Moss. Led Nassau 1959 (Shelby DNF, Mechanical), Porsche RSK 2 Liter winner (Bonnier), GT winner Porsche Carrera (Cuevas); 1960 1,000 km Buenos Aires (Gurney/Gregory DNF Mechanical and accident); Argentine GP (Gregory Behra-Porsche); Havana GP for Sports Cars – 8 car entry, winning overall Moss Maserati, 2 Liter Gregory Porsche RSK, GT Corvette Jeffords, under 2 liter GT Cuevas Porsche Carrera; Sebring 12 hour, largest team entry ever of 8 cars, 3 Maseratis (Gurney/Moss led 8 hours DNF Mechanical), 2 Porsche Carreras (under 2 liter GT winner and 2nd OA GT Sheppard/Dungan), 2 Corvettes Jeffords/Weustoff/Gamble (Gamble drove 12 hours solo – only one of two known to have done this – earned press notice as “iron man” Gamble). OSCA 750 (McCluggage/Windridge DNF).

At the Nurburgring, Gamble qualified the “Yank Tank” Corvette 3rd among the big GT’s (several 250 GT Ferraris), but didn’t get to drive in the race as co-driver Lee Lilley started the race and DNF with a wheel bearing failure.  Gurney/Moss won overall, Gregory/Munaron 4th in the team’s two T61 Maseratis entered.

At the Le Mans 24 hours, Gregory/Daigh led with the famed Streamliner Birdcage Maserati, set a 3-liter lap record and top speed record of 170 mph, DNF with engine failure, other two long tail Maseratis DNF with electrical faults. Gamble/Lilley drove their Corvette conservatively to finish 10th overall.

All Camoradi Maseratis were prepared and maintained by the factory and in European races managed by Maserati. Camoradi’s role was primarily financial.  Gamble was the only full-time principal in Europe, living in Modena, Italy.

Complete Camoradi racing record
(key) (Results in bold indicate pole position; results in italics indicate fastest lap; † indicates shared drive.)

Complete Formula One World Championship results
(key) (Results in bold indicate pole position; results in italics indicate fastest lap; † indicates shared drive.)

Racers
Lloyd Casner was killed driving a Maserati during testing at the 1965 Le Mans event.
Masten Gregory
Dan Gurney
Carroll Shelby
Chuck Daigh
Stirling Moss
Fred Gamble (racing driver)
Jim Rathmann
Rodger Ward
Juan Fangio (Parade lap at Cordova, Argentina 1960)
Chuck Daigh
Jo Bonnier
Jack McAfee
Jim Jeffords
Bill Weustoff
Fred Windridge
Joe Sheppard
Dick Dungan
Pinkie Windridge
Denise McCluggage
Umberto Maglioli
Nino Vaccarella
Nino Todaro
Gino Munaron
Georgio Scarlatti
Lee Lilley
Dave Lane
Johnny Cuevas

References

American auto racing teams
24 Hours of Le Mans teams
World Sportscar Championship teams
Formula One entrants
Auto racing teams established in 1959
Auto racing teams disestablished in 1961